Klinsky (masculine), Klinskaya (feminine), or Klinskoye (neuter) is the name of several rural localities in Russia:
Klinskoye, Brasovsky District, Bryansk Oblast, a selo in Dubrovsky Selsoviet of Brasovsky District of Bryansk Oblast
Klinskoye, Navlinsky District, Bryansk Oblast, a selo in Sokolovsky Selsoviet of Navlinsky District of Bryansk Oblast
Klinskoye, Ozyorsky District, Moscow Oblast, a village in Klishinskoye Rural Settlement of Ozyorsky District of Moscow Oblast
Klinskoye, Serebryano-Prudsky District, Moscow Oblast, a selo in Mochilskoye Rural Settlement of Serebryano-Prudsky District of Moscow Oblast